Han Hee-ju (hangul:, born 2 September 1997) is a South Korean judoka. She competed at the World Judo Championships in 2017 and in 2019 and on both occasions she was eliminated in her first match.

In 2018, she won one of the bronze medals in the women's 63 kg event at the 2018 Asian Games held in Jakarta, Indonesia. In 2019, she won one of the bronze medals in the women's team event at the 2019 Summer Universiade held in Naples, Italy. She qualified for the 2020 Summer Olympics in Tokyo, Japan.

References

External links
 

Living people
1997 births
Place of birth missing (living people)
South Korean female judoka
Judoka at the 2018 Asian Games
Asian Games bronze medalists for South Korea
Asian Games medalists in judo
Medalists at the 2018 Asian Games
Universiade medalists in judo
Universiade bronze medalists for South Korea
Medalists at the 2019 Summer Universiade
Judoka at the 2020 Summer Olympics
Olympic judoka of South Korea
21st-century South Korean women